Northwest Airlink was the brand name of Northwest Airlines' regional airline service, which flew turboprop and regional jet aircraft from Northwest's domestic hubs in Minneapolis, Detroit, and Memphis.  Service was primarily to small-to-medium-sized cities and towns where larger aircraft might not be economical to operate and also to larger markets to either provide additional capacity or more frequent flights than could be justified using mainline aircraft.  Beginning in July 2009, the Northwest Airlink trade name was phased out, and replaced by the Delta Connection trade name for Delta Air Lines as part of the Delta/Northwest merger.

History 
Northwest Airlink was formed in December 1984 when Northwest Airlines took steps to enhance its domestic services by entering a marketing agreement with Mesaba Airlines. Mesaba was the dominant airline serving Minneapolis/St Paul at the time. Under the agreement, Mesaba would operate as Northwest Orient Airlink. Mesaba initially operated commuter and regional turboprop aircraft.  The Mesaba fleet at this time comprised fourteen Beechcraft 99 and one Fokker F27 Friendship aircraft. In 1985 Big Sky Airlines entered the Northwest Airlink agreement with 8-18 passenger seat aircraft including British Aerospace BAe Jetstream 31 and Fairchild Swearingen Metroliner commuter propjets.  Another Northwest Airlink operator was Fischer Brothers Aviation flying CASA C-212 Dornier 228 and Short 360 commuter turboprops.

An Official Airline Guide (OAG) flight schedule dated February 1994 lists the following commuter and regional air carriers operating Northwest Airlink service:

 Express Airlines I 
 Express Airlines II
 Mesaba Airlines
 Northeast Express Regional Airlines
 Precision Airlines

In 2001, Pacific Island Aviation was operating Northwest Airlink service with Short 360 commuter turboprop aircraft between Guam, Saipan and Tinian.

Northwest Jetlink was subsequently formed to operate services with Avro RJ85 jets flown by Mesaba Airlines.  Another Northwest Jetlink operator was Business Express Airlines flying Avro RJ70 jets.

Destinations

Operators and fleet

Fleet

The following air carriers were operating Northwest Airlink service at the time of the merger of Northwest Airlines with Delta Air Lines:

Historical regional jet fleet
The Northwest Airlink brand, through its various regional and commuter airline partners, operated a variety of twinjet aircraft over the years including the following types:

 Avro RJ70
 Avro RJ85

Historical turboprop fleet
The Northwest Airlink brand, through its various regional and commuter airline partners, operated a variety of twin turboprop aircraft over the years including the following types:

 BAe Jetstream 31
 Beechcraft Model 99
 CASA C-212
 Dornier 228
 Fairchild Swearingen Metroliner
 Fokker F27
 Short 360

Incidents and accidents
 March 4, 1987: Northwest Airlink Flight 2268, operated by Fischer Brothers Aviation, a CASA 212 N160FB was on a scheduled flight from Mansfield to Detroit with an intermediate stop in Cleveland when it crashed while landing at Detroit Metropolitan Wayne County Airport. The plane yawed violently to the left about 70 feet above the runway, skidded to the right, hit 3 ground support vehicles in front of Concourse F, and caught fire. Out of 19 occupants onboard (16 passengers and 3 crew), 9 were killed. The cause of the crash was determined to be pilot error.
 December 1, 1993: Northwest Airlink Flight 5719 being operated by Express Airlines I, a Jetstream 31, was flying a scheduled flight from Minneapolis-Saint Paul International Airport to International Falls with an en-route stop in Hibbing when it crashed while approaching for landing at Chisholm-Hibbing Airport. The plane descended struck the tops of trees and then two ridges and came to rest inverted on its right side. All 18 occupants (16 passengers and 2 crew) died. The cause of the crash was the lack of crew-coordination and loss of awareness of the altitude during a night instrument landing.
 October 14, 2004: Pinnacle Airlines Flight 3701 was a Bombardier CRJ200 with a crew of two operating a ferry flight (with no passengers) from Little Rock, AR to Minneapolis, MN. It crashed in a residential area in Jefferson City, MO due to the flight crew pushing the plane past its capabilities and ignoring warnings. Both pilots were killed. The NTSB has since finished its investigation of the accident.
April 12, 2007: Pinnacle Airlines Flight 4712, a Bombardier CRJ200 from Minneapolis–Saint Paul International Airport overran the runway when landing at Cherry Capital Airport (TVC), Traverse City, Michigan. The plane was damaged, but no one was injured. The NTSB determined that the cause of the accident was the "pilots’ decision to land at TVC without performing a landing distance assessment", which in turn was caused by fatigued pilots and unclear directions from the TVC controller tower. The report recommended more landing distance training, post-accident drug testing, and further criteria for runway closures in snow and ice conditions.

See also 
 List of defunct airlines of the United States

References

External links
Northwest Airlines site
Pinnacle Airlines site
Mesaba Aviation site
Compass Airlines site

 
Delta Air Lines
Northwest Airlines
Former SkyTeam affiliate members
Defunct regional airline brands